Miguel Rodríguez Vidal (born 29 April 2003) is a Spanish footballer who plays for Celta de Vigo B mainly as a right winger.

Club career
Born in Redondela, Pontevedra, Galicia, Rodríguez joined RC Celta de Vigo's youth setup in 2013, from CD Choco. In 2020, before even having appeared for the reserves, he was called up to make the pre-season with the main squad.

Rodríguez made his first team – and La Liga – debut on 4 October 2020, coming on as a late substitute for Nolito in a 0–2 away loss to CA Osasuna; aged 17 years and 159 days, he became the fourth-youngest to debut for the club, behind Sansón (the second-youngest of the league's history), Iago Bouzón and Santi Mina.

Personal life
Rodríguez's younger brother Pedro is also a footballer. A central midfielder, he too represented Choco and Celta as a youth.

References

External links

2003 births
Living people
Spanish footballers
Footballers from Redondela
Association football wingers
La Liga players
Primera Federación players
Segunda División B players
Celta de Vigo B players
RC Celta de Vigo players
Spain youth international footballers